Gummalaxmipuram is a village in Parvathipuram Manyam  district of the Indian state of Andhra Pradesh.

Demography

 Census of India, the village had a population of 2,783. The total population constitute, 1,648 males and 1,135 females —a sex ratio of 689 females per 1000 males. 224 children are in the age group of 0–6 years, of which 124 are boys and 100 are girls —a ratio of 807 per 1000. The average literacy rate stands at 86.84% with 2,217 literates, significantly higher than the state average of 67.41%.

References 

Villages in Parvathipuram Manyam district